Yaman was an Arab tribal confederation, originating from South Arabia, known for their centuries-long rivalry with the Qays, another Arab tribal confederation. As late as the nineteenth century battles were fought in Palestine between Qays and Yaman groups.

The Yamanis supported the Umayyads which was integral to them coming to power in the first Muslim civil war (fitna) from 656 to 661 and to them regaining power in the second Muslim civil war from 683 to 692.

In Umayyad times, the Yaman tribes mostly settled in southern Syria, in the steppes around Homs, Palmyra, and Palestine, while the Qays settled in northern Syria, in Jund Qinnasrin, the Jazira, and the Byzantine frontier areas. Another difference between the confederations was that some of the Yamani tribes like the Kalb, Tanukh, Judham, and Tayy had been extant in the Levant before the Muslim conquest, while most of the Qaysi tribes arrived afterwards. Other Yamani tribes such as Madh'hij, Kinda and Himyar, settled in  after the Islamic conquest.

Yaman tribes 
 Azd
 Kalb
 Judham
 Ghassan
 Kinda
 Lakhm
 Madh'hij
 Quda'a
 Khuza’ah
 ’Amilah
 Himyar

Notable battles 
 Battle of Marj Rahit (684)

See also 
 Qays
 Qays–Yaman rivalry
 Qays–Yaman war (793–796)

References

Sources 

 
 

Syria under the Umayyad Caliphate
Tribes of Arabia
Yemeni tribes